Diane Braceland (born January 27, 1950) is an American rower. She competed in the women's double sculls event at the 1976 Summer Olympics.

References

External links
 

1950 births
Living people
American female rowers
Olympic rowers of the United States
Rowers at the 1976 Summer Olympics
Rowers from Philadelphia
21st-century American women